Husein Kavazović (born July 3, 1964) is a Bosnian Islamic cleric and since September 2012 the Grand Mufti (Reis-ul-Ulema) of Bosnia and Herzegovina, after having been Mufti of Tuzla.

Biography
Son of Hasan and Saima Kavazović, Husein attended primary schools in Gradačac and then enrolled at the Gazi Husrev-begova Medresa in Sarajevo, where he graduated in 1983. He left Yugoslavia to study Islamic law from 1985 to 1990 at the Al-Azhar University in Cairo, then came back to defend his master's thesis at the Faculty of Islamic Studies at the University of Sarajevo, in the field of Sharia law.

He then worked as imam, khatib and muallim (lecturer) at the Islamic congregations of Srebrenik and Gradačac, before serving as mufti of Tuzla from 1993 to 2012. In the early 1990s he was also elected member of the Council of the Islamic Community of Bosnia and Herzegovina.

In 2012 the Islamic Community elected him to succeed to Mustafa Cerić as 14th Bosnian Grand Mufti since 1882; at the vote in the Gazi Husrev-beg Mosque, the main mosque of Sarajevo, he received 240 of 382 preferences. In his election program, Kavazović had pushed inter alia for the co-operation with other religious communities and a wider "incorporation of women into the work of the Islamic religious community".

Under an agreement, Kavazović was suggested to also serve as Grand Mufti of Hungary.

He speaks Bosnian, Arabic and English.

Controversies
In his speech in Switzerland made in May 2016, Kavazović said that it shouldn't be allowed for "Vlachs to govern Srebrenica", using a derogatory term for Serbs that means "foreigner" or social category of shepherds even though Kavazović's paternal ancestors were also Muslim settlers from East Herzegovina of Serb roots that domicile Bosnian Ottoman governors designated as Vlachs. He also said "Either we water ourselves with blood or we go to the polls every four years and confirm our sovereignty. Choose Bosniaks, whether we shed blood every 20-30 years or go to the polls. Our house is our obligation, and to preserve Srebrenica, especially. You have to defend yourself against them and the cemeteries. Stay awake for your homeland."

Kavazović has been attacked and threatened multiple times, together with other Bosnian Muslim officials, in the Bosnian language edition of the ISIS magazine, Al Rumiyah.

Notes
Michael Martens: Gegen Rache und Küsse: Das neue Oberhaupt der bosnischen Muslime tritt sein Amt an, in: Frankfurter Allgemeine Zeitung, 16 November 2012
Meldung über die Wahl von Kavazović bei "Nachrichten.at" retrieved 15 December 2012
Meldung der Deutschen Welle über die Wahl von Kavazović retrieved 15 December 2012
Biografija reisu-l-uleme mr. Husein ef. Kavazovića (Rijaset Islamske zajednice u Bosni i Hercegovini)

References

|-

1964 births
Living people
People from Gradačac
Gazi Husrev Bey's Madrasa alumni
University of Sarajevo alumni
Al-Azhar University alumni
Bosniaks of Bosnia and Herzegovina
Bosnia and Herzegovina Sunni Muslims
Hanafis
Maturidis
Grand Muftis of Bosnia and Herzegovina
20th-century imams
21st-century imams
Bosnian Sunni Muslim scholars of Islam
Islam in Bosnia and Herzegovina